The following is a timeline of the history of the municipality of Zürich, Switzerland.

Prehistory

 4th century BC – Helvetii/ Celtic Oppidum Uetliberg
 1st century BC – Helvetii tribe: Oppidum Zürich-Lindenhof

1st–8th centuries
 70 CE – Roman Vicus and Gallo-Roman settlement Turicum, Thermengasse hypocaust between Weinplatz and Münsterhof
 122 or before – Roman island sanctuary on Grosser Hafner island.
 256 - Town rebuilt by Alemanni.
 610 – Castellum turegum mentioned by Columban, meaning probably the Gallo-Roman-Allemanic settlement

9th–14th centuries
 853 – Fraumünster founded.
 857 – St. Peter church first mentioned.
 before 1200 – Pfalz on the Lindenhof hill
 1218 – Zürich becomes free imperial city.
 1220 – Grossmünster inaugurated (approximate date).
 1230 – Predigerkloster founded (no foundation document).
 1231 – Predigerkirche Zürich, construction started.
 1237 – Oetenbach nunnery first mentioned.
 1267 – Feud between Zürich and Rudolf I von Habsburg against the Regensberg family (1267/68).
 1270 – Augustinerkloster Zürich established and Augustinerkirche Zürich built.
1273 – First mention of Jews in Zürich.
 1280 – Grimmenturm built by the Bilgeri ministerialis  (around, maybe ~1250)
 1291 – On 28 November 1291 Countess Elisabeth von Rapperswil concluded a three-year alliance with the city of Zürich against the Dukes of Austria-Habsburg.
 1292 – Battle nearby Winterthur, Zürich defeated, legendary siege of Zürich.
 1336
 Guilds in operation, some members of the previous council refuged to Johann I (Habsburg-Laufenburg).
 Zunft zum Kämbel established.
 1349 – Pogrom against the Jewish population of Zürich.
 1350 – Brun opponents executed on occasion of the so-called Mordnacht, Rapperswil Castle destroyed by Brun troops, Count Johann II von Rapperswil imprisoned, Dukes of Habsburg started counterattack and forced Zürich to search for new allies.
 1351 – Zürich joins Swiss confederation.
1354 – Jews resettle in Zürich.
 1377 – Haus zum Rüden (guildhouse) first mentioned.
 1383 – Jewish citizens allowed to renew the Synagogue and the Jewish cemetery.
 1389 – Zunfthaus zur Haue (guildhouse) first mentioned.

15th century
 1407 – Herrschaft Regensberg became äussere Vogtei of Zürich.
 1423 – Jewish citizens forced to leave Zürich until 1850.
 1437 – Elisabeth von Matsch granted the mayor and council of the city of Zürich or their representatives the authority to act on their behalf, immediately after the usurpations of lands of the Toggenburg County by the cantons of Schwyz and Glarus, and to lock Grynow.
 1440 – Zürich expelled from Swiss confederation; Old Zürich War begins.
 1443 – Battle of St. Jakob an der Sihl.
 1451 – Zürich re-admitted to Swiss confederation.
 1460 – Thurgau becomes part of city.
 1467 – Winterthur becomes part of city.
 1484 – Stein am Rhein becomes part of city.
 1496 – Eglisau becomes part of city.

16th century
 1518 – Huldrych Zwingli becomes pastor of Grossmünster.
 1522 – Affair of the Sausages.
 1522 – Katharina von Zimmern, last imperial abbess of Zürich, passed the Fraumünster Abbey into the possession of the city of Zürich.
 1524
 Reformation in Zürich
 Augustiner and Prediger monasteries and Oetenbach nunnery in Zürich and Rüti Abbey in Rüti nearby Rapperswil disestablished.
 1525 - Carolinum Zürich and Rütiamt established
 1527 – Kappel Abbey disestablished.
 1531 – Froschauer Bible published.
 1535 - Coverdale Bible published.
 1576 – Murerplan published.

17th-18th centuries
 1634 – City library established.
1634 – Jews are forbidden from entering the city.
 1642 – Fortifications expanded
 1648 – City status changes from Reichsstadt to Republik.
 1662 – Bauschänzli at Bürkliplatz built.
 1746
 Naturforschende Gesellschaft in Zürich (scientific society).
 Old botanical garden established.
 1757 – Zunfthaus zur Meisen built.
 1770 – Orell, Gessner, Füssli & Cie in business.
 1780 - Zürcher Zeitung (newspaper) begins publication.
 1799
 June – First Battle of Zurich.
 September – Second Battle of Zurich.

19th century
 1804 – Kantonspolizei Zürich (police) established as "Landjäger-Corps des Kantons Zürich."
 1814 – Zürich District established.
 1832 – Zunfthaus zur Saffran built.
 1833 – University of Zurich founded.
 1834 – Aktientheater built.
 1836 - Confiserie Sprüngli in business.
 1837
 Staatsarchiv Zürich established.
 Predecessor construction of Frauenbad Stadthausquai inaugurated.
 1838 - Villa Belvoir and Münsterbrücke (bridge) built.
 1839 – Züriputsch.
 1847
 Spanisch-Brötli-Bahn begins operating; Zürich Hauptbahnhof opens.
 Bahnhofbrücke (bridge) built.
 1850
 Population 35,483 in city; 250,698 in canton.
 The Jewish citizens are allowed to re-settle in Zürich (see 1423).
 1853 – Villa Tobler built.
 1855
 Stock Exchange established.
 Eidgenössische Polytechnische Schule and Zürich Oerlikon railway station open.
 1859
 10 November: Peace treaty signed in Zürich.
 Limmatquai built.
 1860
 Public schools established.
 Population 44,978.
 1862 – Israelitische Cultusgemeinde Zürich (ICZ) founded.
 1868 - Tonhalle Orchester Zürich formed.
 1870 – Population: 58,657.
 1875 – Pestalozzianum founded.
 1880 – Population: 78,345 in city; 316,074 in canton.
 1884
 Synagoge Zürich Löwenstrasse built.
 Quaibrücke (bridge) built.
 1886 – Strandbad Tiefenbrunnen opened.
 1887 – Seeuferanlage by Arnold Bürkli, Arboretum Zürich and Bürkliplatz inaugurated.
 1888
 Population: 94,129.
 Frauenbad Stadthausquai (public bath) opened.
 1889 – Knabenschiessen begins.
 1890 – Seebad Utoquai opened.
 1891
 Eduard Spelterini starts his Urania balloon.
  opens.
 Gottfried Keller Stiftung founded by Lydia Escher (1858–1891).
 1892 – Volkstheater am Pfauen built.
 1893
 City expands, incorporating Wollishofen, Enge, Leimbach, Wiedikon, Wipkingen, Fluntern and Hottingen, Aussersihl, Oberstrass, Unterstrass, Riesbach and Hirslanden.
 Rathausbrücke built.
 August: International Socialist and Labour Congress held in Zürich.
 Tages-Anzeiger newspaper begins publication.
1895 – Orthodox Jews found the Israelitische Religionsgesellschaft Zürich.
 1896
  (hiking club) formed.
 Sechseläutenplatz first mentioned.
 1898
 Bund Schweizerischer Frauenvereine (BSF) founded.
 Swiss National Museum opens.
 1900 – Population: 150,703 in city; 431,036 in canton.

20th century

1900s-1940s
 1901 – Kriminalmuseum associated with the Kantonspolizei Zürich founded.
 1902
 Sechseläuten and Böögg-burning event commences.
 Voliere Zürich established.
 1903 – Zürichsee-Schifffahrtsgesellschaft (ZSG) founded.
 1909 – Paddlesteamer Stadt Zürich put into commission.
 1910
 Kunsthaus Zürich opens.
 Water airport Zürichhorn opens.
 1906 - Schweizerisches Sozialarchiv founded.
 1914
 Zentralbibliothek Zürich (library) founded.
 Paddlesteamer Stadt Rapperswil put into commission.
 1915 – Mieterverband founded.
 1916 - Cabaret Voltaire and Dada art movement founded.
 1918 - During the Swiss General Strike, the Swiss Government responded by deploying  20,000 soldiers to Zurich.
 1919 – Ad Astra Aero founded.
 1920 - Population: 206,120 in city; 538,602 in canton.
 1922
  Kino Walche (cinema) opens.
 Strandbad Mythenquai opened.
 1926 – Der Schweizerische Beobachter founded.
 1928
 SAFFA exhibition at Saffa-Insel held.
 Weltklasse Zürich begins.
 1929 - Zürich Zoologischer Garten (zoo) opens.
1929 – Zürich hosts the sixteenth World Zionist congress.
 1931 – Sukkulentensammlung established.
 1937 - 2 June: Premiere of Berg's opera Lulu.
1937 – Zürich hosts the twentieth World Zionist congress.
 1939
 Hallenstadion opens.
 Landi39 at Zürichhorn and Mythenquai
 1941 – Bernhard-Theater Zürich founded by Rudolf Bernhard.
 1945 – 4 March: Bombing by Allied forces.
 1948 – Klubschule Migros founded.
 1949 – Ex Libris (bookshop) became part the Migros group.

1950s-1990s
 1951 – Reederei Zürich AG established.
 1952 – Reederei Zürich cargo liner Adele christened by Adele Duttweiler
 1954 – Zürich 6-day race begins.
 1956 – Besuch der alten Dame premiered at Schauspielhaus Zürich, Ruedi Walter played the blind eunuch Loby, and Paul Bühlmann the conductor.
 1959 – Theater am Hechtplatz opened.
 1960 - Population: 440,170 in city; 952,304 in canton.
 1961 – Theater am Neumarkt opened.
 1962 – Les Sauterelles founded.
 1963 – Mahmood Mosque, Zürich built.
 1964 – Theater an der Winkelwiese opened.
 1966 – Sigmund Widmer elected mayor.
 1967 – Centre Le Corbusier inaugurated.
 1971 – Musikabteilung established.
 1975 – Limmat Verlag founded.
 1976 – Rotpunktverlag founded.
 1977 – Botanical Garden of the University of Zurich opens.
 1979 – Ursula Koch refuses to swear on 'Vaterland'
 1980
 May: Opernhauskrawalle, the Opernhaus youth protests known as Züri brännt meaning Zürich is burning.
 September: Zürcher Theater Spektakel begins.
 October: Rote Fabrik opens as a youth culture centre.
 1981
 WOZ Die Wochenzeitung founded.
 Züri brännt (movie), a documentary film of 1981.
 1984
 Opera House renovated.
 Theater Rigiblick opened, built in 1901 as Rigiblick restaurant and former Gastsaal venue.
 1986 – Irchelpark opened.
 1988 – Sozialwerke Pfarrer Sieber founded by pastor Ernst Sieber.
 1989 – Gesellschaft zu Fraumünster founded.
 1992 – Street Parade begins.
 1993 – Technopark Zürich established.
1995 – The ETH Zürich opens a documentation centre for Jewish history in their historical archives.
 1996 – Langstrasse festival begins.
 2000 - Population: 363,273 in city; 1,247,906 in canton.

21st century

 2001 – Digitec founded.
 2003 - Sister city relationship established with San Francisco, USA.
 2005 – Zurich Film Festival and Neujahrsmarathon Zürich begin.
2005 – The Jewish religious communities are recognised as legal entities in the canton of Zürich.
 2008 – SIX Group formed.
 2009
 Corine Mauch elected mayor.
  opens on the A3 motorway in vicinity of city.

See also
 History of Zürich
 List of mayors of Zürich
 List of cultural property of national significance in Switzerland: Zürich
 Timelines of other municipalities in Switzerland: Basel, Bern, Geneva
History of the Jews in Zürich

References

This article incorporates information from the German Wikipedia and French Wikipedia.

Bibliography

in English

in German
  1878-1890
  and Éditions Payot, Lausanne 2005, .

External links

 
 Links to fulltext city directories for Zurich via Wikisource
 Europeana. Items related to Zurich, various dates.

Years in Switzerland

Zurich
Switzerland history-related lists